Spirularia is an order of marine Cnidarians, tube-dwelling anemones, in the subclass Ceriantharia. It is one of the two orders making up Ceriantharia and includes two families, Botrucnidiferidae 
and Cerianthidae, and around 99 species. The two orders differ in the makeup of their cnidome (the types of cnidocyte present), the relative sizes of the oral discs and the shape and structure of the mesenteries.

These anemones dwell in parchment-like tubes immersed in soft sediment, and have two whorls of tentacles, the outer tentacles being much longer than the inner ones.

References

 
Ceriantharia
Cnidarian orders